Solange Sanfourche (18 July 1922 – 12 June 2013), alias Marie-Claude, was a French resistance fighter in Dordogne during World War II.

Life and work 
She was born in Carsac-Aillac (Dordogne), France. 

In December 1945, Sanfourche married in Périgueux, Édouard Valéry (1924–2010), commissioner of operations in the Dordogne region for the resistance movement during World War II. 

Known by the code name Marie-Claude, she worked as a typist, secretary, mail carrier and liaison officer. During the German occupation, the Sanfourche family hid and housed dozens of clandestine freedom fighters in Périgueux who were wanted by the Gestapo or the militia of the occupied-French government. 

Sanfourche died at 90 on 12 June 2013, in Sarlat-la-Canéda (Dordogne).

References 

   

1922 births
2013 deaths
People from Dordogne
French people of World War II
Female resistance members of World War II
French Resistance members